Vindza (can also be written as Vinza) is a district in the Pool Department of Republic of the Congo.

References 

Pool Department
Districts of the Republic of the Congo